"Add Some Music to Your Day" is a song by American rock band the Beach Boys that was released in the US on February 23, 1970 as the lead single from their album Sunflower. It was written by Brian Wilson, Joe Knott and Mike Love. Wilson later said that Knott "was a friend of mine who wasn't a songwriter but he contributed a couple of lines. But I can't remember which ones!"

The song features lyrics that are a celebration of music and its ubiquitous presence in daily life. In April, the single peaked at number 64 in the US during a five-week stay. Disc jockeys generally refused to play the song on the radio, with one DJ reportedly stating that the Beach Boys "aren't hip anymore". According to band promoter Fred Vail, WFIL program director Jay Cook refused to play the song even after "telling me how great the Beach Boys are and how great Brian is."

Personnel
Sourced from Craig Slowinski
The Beach Boys
 Brian Wilson – lead vocals, harmony and backing vocals, Rocksichord, production
 Mike Love – lead vocals, harmony and backing vocals
 Al Jardine – lead vocals, harmony and backing vocals
 Carl Wilson – lead vocals, harmony and backing vocals, 12-string acoustic guitars, Chamberlin
 Dennis Wilson – harmony and backing vocals, drums, percussion (flicked car and house keys, bongos, guiro, Jaw harp)
 Bruce Johnston – lead vocals, harmony and backing vocals, bass
Production staff
 Stephen Desper – engineer

Charts

References

Sources
 
 
 

1970 songs
Songs written by Mike Love
Songs written by Brian Wilson
The Beach Boys songs
Song recordings produced by the Beach Boys
Reprise Records singles
Songs about music